Euura samolad is a species of sawfly belonging to the family Tenthredinidae (common sawflies). The larva feed within galls on the leaves of willows (Salix species). It was first described by René Malaise in 1920.

Description of the gall
The green to bright red, densely hairy gall is found on the underside of a leaf of the host plant. It is pea-sized and has a narrow attachment to the leaves of downy willow (Salix lapponum) or its hybrids.

Distribution
The gall is found in northern Europe, from Scotland, France and Fennoscandia to northern Russia, possibly as far as the far east.

References

Tenthredinidae
Gall-inducing insects
Hymenoptera of Asia
Hymenoptera of Europe
Insects described in 1920
Willow galls
Taxa named by René Malaise